Vrutham is a 1987 Indian Malayalam-language film, directed by I. V. Sasi and produced by Raju Mathew for Central Pictures, starring Kamal Haasan, Suresh Gopi, Geetha, Captain Raju, Thilakan and Shobana.

The film marked the return of Kamal Haasan to Malayalam language films after 1982. Actor Suresh Gopi in the earlier period of his career did a supporting role in this film. The film did moderate business. This movie dubbed into Tamil-language as Viratham and released on 10 September 1987.

Plot 

Vrutham is a family oriented revenge film where Balu gets falsely implicated in a murder and his quest for revenge on the wrongdoers.

Cast 

 Kamal Haasan as Balu
 Shobana as Nancy, Balu's Love interest (dubbed by Ambili dubbing artist)
 Suresh Gopi as Sunny Abraham 
 Geetha as Radha Menon
 Captain Raju as Victor
 M. G. Soman as Charlie 
 Sreenath as James Chacko
 Sukumari as Savithri
 K.P.A.C. Sunny as Barristor Menon 
 Thilakan as Chackochan 
 Janardanan as Avarachan 
 Babu Antony as Freddy 
 Rohini as Thresia 
 Prathapachandran as Nancy's Father 
 Sankaradi as Kaimal 
 Jagannatha Varma as Subrahmanya Iyer 
 Kundara Johnny 
 Vincent as  Customs Officer
 Devan as  Devadas
 Ragini (New)
 C. I. Paul as Chandran Pillai 
 Thodupuzha Vasanthi as Janaki 
 Jose Prakash as Jailor 
 Valsala Menon   
 T. P. Madhavan as Prasad 
 Kunjandi
 Jayalalita

Soundtrack 

The music was composed by Shyam and lyrics were written by Bichu Thirumala.

References

External links 
 

1980s Malayalam-language films
Films with screenplays by T. Damodaran
1987 films
Films directed by I. V. Sasi